Dave Smith (1933 – August 29, 2009) was an American football player and coach.  He served as the head football coach at Oklahoma State University–Stillwater in 1972 and at Southern Methodist University from 1973 to 1975, compiling a career college football record of 23–19–2.  He played quarterback at Lockhart High School and later Texas A&M University.  He lived in Granbury, Texas.

Head coaching record

College

References

1933 births
2009 deaths
American football quarterbacks
Oklahoma State Cowboys football coaches
SMU Mustangs football coaches
Texas A&M Aggies football players
Texas A&M–Kingsville Javelinas football coaches
Winnipeg Blue Bombers coaches
High school football coaches in Texas
People from Granbury, Texas
People from Lockhart, Texas
Deaths from cancer in Texas